Waterval is a residential township in front of Elim Hospital, it is situated in the Hlanganani district of the former Tsonga homeland of Gazankulu, alongside the R578 road to Giyani  in the Limpopo province of South Africa. Waterval includes , Lemana, Elim Hospital, Elim Mall, Hubyeni Shopping centre, Magangeni but excludes Shirley village, which is a separate and stand alone farm, sharing a legal boundary with Waterval and Mbhokota village to the east.

As of mid-2015 population statistics (Stats SA), it had a population of 9,000 people and is part of  Traditional Authority or Elim/Shirley Traditional Authority, with a combined population of more than 22,000 people according to mid-2015 population statistics (Stats SA).

The  Traditional Authority or Elim/Shirley Traditional Authority proper includes Mbhokota, Bokisi, Chavani, Riverplaats and Nwaxinyamani and has a total population of more than 42,000 people combined. Because of Apartheid policies of the 1960s, the land of Njhakanjhaka Traditional Authority was reduced to Waterval, Shirley, Lemana and Elim, leaving the villages of Mbhokota, Bokisi, Chavani, Riverplaats and Nwaxinyamani to be governed independently by Chief Njhakanjhaka's first born son, Chief Chavani Njhakanjhaka Mukhari. These villages are collectively known as  Nkhensani Tribal Authority, under Chief Njhakanjhaka's son, Hosi Chavani. Nkhensani Tribal Authority's offices are based at Chavani Village, behind the township of Waterval.

Governance
Waterval was proclaimed a township in 1980 by the former Gazankulu homeland, in the district of Hlanganani. Waterval also forms part of Njhakanjhaka Traditional Authority. The Hlanganani Regional Court for the District of Hlanganani (wrongly called "Waterval Magistrate Courts"), the historic Elim Hospital, Waterval Post Office, Police Station, Hubyeni Shopping Centre, and the new Elim Mall are all situated in Waterval. Prior to the Swiss encounter, Chief Njhakanjhaka exercised authority in the area. This western portion of Gazankulu was known as the Tsonga "finger" during the 1950s until the late 1960s by the Apartheid officials of the Department of Bantu Affairs and Development. When Apartheid ended in 1994, the area was shifted to Makhado Local Municipality and now forms part of Vhembe District Municipality.

History of Hosi Njhakanjhaka: Headman of Spelonken

Tsonga Trading Posts in the interior
From the year 1554 when Lourenco Marques, a Portuguese trader settled on the land of the Tsonga and began to trade between Portugal and Africa. Between 1554-1800, the Tsonga people started to leave the east coast and began trading with the interior. They established 'trade routes' that included the whole eastern Transvaal and the northern Transvaal. The Tsonga traded goods with both the Venda and the Pedi between the years 1554-1800 but they did not settled in these areas. Goods traded with the Venda and the Pedi included beads, clothes, maize, guns, soap, and shoes, which the Tsonga obtained from the Portuguese and were rewarded with both ivory and iron by the Venda in exchange for goods. The Venda were skilled locksmith, they traded iron to the Tsonga and the Tsonga sold them Maize and introduced maize to the whole of Venda. Prior to trade between the Tsonga and the Venda, the Venda used to eat sorghum as stample food, but with the arrival of the Tsonga, the Venda ceased to eat sorghum as staple food and started eating maize meal, which the Tsonga introduced to Venda. Both the Tsonga and the Venda named the new staple food Vuswa (Tsonga), Vhuswa (Venda). Maize was introduced to the Tsonga people by Vasco Da Gama in 1497, Vasco Da Gama stayed briefly on the land of the Tsonga and named it "Terra da Boa Gente" (Land of the friendly people), before departing to India on a sea voyage. Vasco Da Gama or the Portuguese have obtained maize from South America where they were in their early stages of massive colonisation of their colony called Portuguese Brazil or modern day Brazil, Maize is indigenous to South America. However, as trade with the interior developed over time, the Tsonga established what is called 'trading station', these stations were developed slowly into small villages. The purpose of the 'trading stations' was to prevent armed robbery since traders were often robbed their goods, so trading stations provided security against robbery since all these stations were guarded 24 hours by armed personnel and their staff. Some of the Tsonga traders never returned to the east coast and were given responsibility of taking care of these trading stations. Some Tsonga traders stayed permanently in the Venda and Pedi villages, never returning to the east coast. For more than 250-years, the Tsonga people had no interest in colonising the eastern and northern Transvaal, since they treated both the eastern and northern Transvaal as trading areas only.

Full scale 'internal colonisation' of both the eastern Transvaal and northern Transvaal only begin from 1820 onwards, this was a period when Soshangane invaded the Tsonga homeland and a mass exodus of Tsonga refugees left the east coast in their thousands into both the eastern and northern Transvaal. This is known as 'forced colonisation' since the Tsonga were forced to vacate their homeland due to war. These new 'colonies' that were invaded by the Tsonga refugees were not new areas, they were known to the Tsonga for more than 250-years. So the Tsonga refugees flocked in their thousands and started the process of 'internal colonisation', which after the period of 80-years (1820-1900), resulted in the 'internal colonisation of the whole eastern and northern Transvaal by the Tsonga respectively. The land where Waterval is situated today was one of the ancient 'Tsonga trading station' and was already known to the Tsonga people for centuries before the process of 'internal colonisation', however, it was not known as Waterval.

Chief Njhakanjhaka and his people arrived here between 1818 and 1820 as refugees from Mozambique during the wars of Soshangane, also known as Manukosi. Chief Njhakanjhaka was one of many Tsonga leaders who rebelled against the authority of Soshangane and was defeated by the Nguni warriors under the command of Soshangane. Chief Njhakanjhaka had tried to defend his Tsonga people against the Nguni invaders, who not only oppressed his people but also enslaved women and children. To avoid death and execution at the hands of Soshangane, Njhakanjhaka fled with his people and settle at a place known today as Waterval. The land where Waterval is situated is in fact Njhakanjhaka.

Chief Njhakanjhaka was one of Chief of Spelonken (modern day Valdezia, Elim, Nwa-Xinyamani, Bungeni, Chavani, Mbhokota, Shirley, in fact the whole of Hlanganani). As Headman of Spelenkon, Chief Njhakanjhaka exercised authority over 50,000 Tsonga people who resides at Spelonken district; the 1905 Transvaal statistics put the number of Tsonga speakers of Spelonken at 50,000 souls. However, Chief Njhakanjhaka was undermined by João Albasini, who made himself paramount chief of all Vatsonga in modern Hlanganani district. Albasini was indeed a paramount chief of all Vatsonga in the Spelonken district (modern day Hlanganani district), it was only after the death of Joao Albasini in 1888 that Chief Njhakanjhaka was able to claim back his chieftainship from Albasini.

By 1888, the Swiss Missionaries have already taken Valdezia, and Chief Njhakanjhaka was unable to become a chief at Valdezia, a position he held before the Swiss Missionaries converted the Vatsonga people to Christianity. In addition, the Vatsonga headmen all over Spelonken, known today as Bungeni, Nwaxinyamani, Chavani and other Tsonga settlements started to declare their independence from Chief Njhakanjhaka and were successful in forming independent polities. It is therefore incorrect to think that Chief Njhakanjhaka is a chief at Elim and Njhakanjhaka village only, the contrary is true, Njhakanjhaka is in fact a Senior or a Paramount chief of all Vatsonga people in the whole Spelonken district and all Vatsonga people in the Spelenkon district accepted the authority of Njhakanjhaka. All other chiefs that exist today in Hlanganani were appointed by João Albasini, and that weakened the power of Njhakanjhaka as his chiefdom was reduced into a small village. Hosi Njhakanjhaka had 33 wives and more than 100 children.

History 
The history of Waterval goes back to the founding of the Swiss Mission Station in Elim in 1878 and the founding of Elim Hospital in 1899. Prior to this, the Swiss Mission Station was located in Valdezia, 10 km east of Elim. The missionaries moved from Valdezia to Waterval because many of them contracted malaria. The Farm Waterval included the land where Elim Hospital is located and the whole of Njhakanjhaka and Rivoni but excluded Shirley.

Tsonga Finger
During the 1950s until the late 1960s, the land of Waterval, Elim, Shirley, Chavani, Mbhokota, Riverplaats, Nwaxinyamani, Bokisi, Bungeni, Valdezia and Nkuzana was dubbed the 'Tsonga finger'. It was located in what the Apartheid government considered a White area in the nearby town of Louis Trichardt and forced removal was imminent. The Apartheid government attempted, without success, to remove the Tsonga from Waterval and the surrounding lands. By the late 1960s, as a results of negotiations between the South African government and professor Hudson William Edison Ntsanwisi, the Tsonga finger was annexed to Gazankulu, as well as Elim Hospital.

Adjacent areas

Shirley
The village of Shirley is situated above Waterval, Shirley is divided into four villages, the one above Waterval, the one on top of the mountain, the one below the mountain and Akanani, which is the newest of these villages. Shirley is also home to Vonani Bila, a poet, writer and entertainer.

Rivoni
This is the original home of Chief Njhakanjhaka, Rivoni also houses the Njhakanjhaka Traditional Authority Offices, Chief Njhakanjhaka hold tribal meetings here (Hubyeni). The Rivoni School for the Blind is also situated here, the SABC presenter, Rhulani Baloyi was born here, she attended Rivoni School for the Blind.

Elim
The village of Elim took its name from the historic Elim Hospital, many prominent Tsonga people also came from Elim, The former commissioner of the Independent Electoral Commission of South Africa, Ms Pansy Tlakula was married here and her husband's family, the Tlakulas, are the land owners of Elim. The new Elim Mall is situated on land owned by the Tlakula family. Elim refers to Njhakanjhaka village, Rivoni and Lemana, but exclude Waterval and Shirley.

Elim Hospital
Chief Njhakanjhaka, Hakamela Tlakula's grandfather and Mr Job Makhubele played a vital role during the establishment of Elim Hospital. Hakamela Tlakula's grandfather and Mr Job Makhubele owned pieces of land where Elim Hospital is situated. Chief Njhakanjhaka, on behalf of Mr Tlakula and Mr Makhubele, leased the land to the Swiss missionaries in 1897 for a period of 100 years so that Elim Hospital may be established. Therefore, Chief Njhakanjhaka, Mr Tlakula and Mr Makhubele are credited with the establishment of Elim Hospital. Prior to 1899 (the year Elim Hospital was established), the western half of Elim Hospital was owned by the Tlakula family as their family property, while the eastern half of Elim Hospital was owned by Mr Job Makhubele as his family property (the Makhubele family changed their surname and they are known today as Lowane family).

The Lowane family still resides today at Elim and their house can be found on the main road opposite Elim Mall, along the R578 road, while the Tlakula family resides behind Elim Mall, opposite Elim Hospital. Therefore, the Tlakula and Lowane families are the true owners of Elim Hospital because they have title deeds of the land where Elim Hospital is situated. That is why all the hawkers who are selling in front of Elim Hospital pay rent every month to the Tlakula family.

Elim Hospital is a very popular hospital in South Africa and abroad, particularly in Switzerland where many missionaries came from. The Swiss brought Christianity to the people of Njhakanjhaka, one can still see the impact of such civilisation in the whole of Elim area.

Elim Mall
The Tlakula family is still the owners of the land where Elim Mall is situated, they claim 60% of the profit made from the mall, while Twin City, the developer of the mall, get 40% of the profit. Land negotiations took more than five years before the Tlakula family could release the land for development to Twin City. As a sign of the Tlakula family's ownership of Elim Mall, the centre manager, Ms Basani Tlakula, is a daughter of the Tlakula family and she manages the mall on behalf of the Tlakula family.

Hubyeni Shopping centre
Chief Njhakanjhaka is the owner of the land where Hubyeni shopping centre is situated, during the land negotiation with Kerr Development, Chief Njhakanjhaka's rules were that 10% of shareholding should be transferred to the  Traditional Authority under Elim/Shirley community.

Lemana Multi-purpose centre
Formerly a college of education, Lemana is an intellectual bastion of the Tsonga and Shangaan people. Many Vatsonga were educated here. The former FRELIMO President, Eduardo Mondlane was educated at Lemana.

Vatsonga Cultural Village
On top of Ribolla Mountain one finds a place dedicated to the history of the Tsonga people. It is possible to see 29 villages down the mountain. The Vatsonga Cultural Village was started by a young woman who felt that the culture of the Vatsonga was under attack by some European influences. A visit to the Vatsonga Cultural Village will leave one proud to be a Tsonga speaker. The architecture of houses at Vastonga Cultural Village is a true reflection of the traditional Tsonga village and lifestyle. The construction of the cultural village costed the Government more than R1 million.

royal lineage and succession
 Xilumani (born in Mozambique, date not known), died in Waterval/Shirley
 Shinguwa (date of birth not known), died in Waterval/Shirley
  I (died in 1930 at Waterval farm, known today as Shirley Village)
  II (crowned in 1995 and died in 2007 at Shirley Village)
  III (crowned in 2011 at Shirley Village, he is the current ruler and chief of Elim/Shirley Community)

References

Populated places in the Makhado Local Municipality